Ceuta is a Spanish autonomous city on the north coast of Africa.

Bordered by Morocco, it lies along the boundary between the Mediterranean Sea and the Atlantic Ocean. It is one of several Spanish territories in Africa and, along with Melilla and the Canary Islands, one of only a few that are permanently inhabited by a civilian population. It was a regular municipality belonging to the province of Cádiz prior to the passing of its Statute of Autonomy in March 1995, henceforth becoming an autonomous city.

Ceuta, like Melilla and the Canary Islands, was classified as a free port before Spain joined the European Union. Its population consists mainly of Christians and Muslims. There is also a small minority of Sephardic Jews and Sindhi Hindus, the latter of whom originate from current-day Pakistan.

Spanish is the only official language, but Darija Arabic is prominent as well.

Names
The name Abyla has been said to have been a Punic name ("Lofty Mountain" or "Mountain of God") for Jebel Musa, the southern Pillar of Hercules. The name of the mountain was in fact Habenna ("Stone" or "Stele") or ʾAbin-ḥīq ("Rock of the Bay"), in reference to the nearby Bay of Benzú.

The settlement below Jebel Musa was later renamed for the seven hills around the site, collectively referred to as the "Seven Brothers". In particular, the Roman stronghold at the site took the name "Fort at the Seven Brothers". This was gradually shortened to Septem ( Sépton) or, occasionally, Septum or Septa. These clipped forms continued as Berber Sebta and Arabic Sabtan or Sabtah, which themselves became  in Portuguese and Spanish (locally ).

History

Ancient

Controlling access between the Atlantic Ocean and the Mediterranean Sea, the Strait of Gibraltar is an important military and commercial chokepoint. The Phoenicians realized the extremely narrow isthmus joining the Peninsula of Almina to the African mainland makes Ceuta eminently defensible and established an outpost there early in the 1st millenniumBC. The Greek geographers record it by variations of Abyla, the ancient name of nearby Jebel Musa. Beside Calpe, the other Pillar of Hercules now known as the Rock of Gibraltar, the Phoenicians established Kart at what is now San Roque, Spain. Other good anchorages nearby became Phoenician and then Carthaginian ports at what are now Tangiers and Cádiz.

After Carthage's destruction in the Punic Wars, most of northwest Africa was left to the Roman client states of Numidia andaround AbylaMauretania. Punic culture continued to thrive in what the Romans knew as "Septem". After the Battle of Thapsus in 46 BC, Caesar and his heirs began annexing north Africa directly as Roman provinces but, as late as Augustus, most of Septem's Berber residents continued to speak and write in Punic.

Caligula assassinated the Mauretanian king Ptolemy in AD40 and seized his kingdom, which Claudius organized in AD 42, placing Septem in the province of Tingitana and raising it to the level of a colony. It subsequently was romanized and thrived into the late 3rd century, trading heavily with Roman Spain and becoming well known for its salted fish. Roads connected it overland with Tingis (Tangiers) and Volubilis. Under  in the late 4th century, Septem still had 10,000 inhabitants, nearly all Christian citizens speaking African Romance, a local dialect of Latin.

Medieval

Vandals, probably invited by Count Boniface as protection against the empress dowager, crossed the strait near Tingis around 425 and swiftly overran Roman North Africa. Their king Gaiseric focused his attention on the rich lands around Carthage; although the Romans eventually accepted his conquests and he continued to raid them anyway, he soon lost control of Tingis and Septem in a series of Berber revolts. When Justinian decided to reconquer the Vandal lands, his victorious general Belisarius continued along the coast, making Septem a westernmost outpost of the Byzantine Empire around 533. Unlike the former ancient Roman administration, however, Eastern Rome did not push far into hinterland and made the more defensible Septem their regional capital in place of Tingis.

Epidemics, less capable successors and overstretched supply lines forced a retrenchment and left Septem isolated. It is likely that its count was obliged to pay homage to the Visigoth Kingdom in Spain in the early 7th century. There are no reliable contemporary accounts of the end of the Islamic conquest of the Maghreb around 710. Instead, the rapid Muslim conquest of Spain produced romances concerning Count Julian of Septem and his betrayal of Christendom in revenge for the dishonor that befell his daughter at King Roderick's court. Allegedly with Julian's encouragement and instructions, the Berber convert and freedman Tariq ibn Ziyad took his garrison from Tangiers across the strait and overran the Spanish so swiftly that both he and his master Musa bin Nusayr fell afoul of a jealous caliph, who stripped them of their wealth and titles.

After the death of Julian, sometimes also described as a king of the Ghomara Berbers, Berber converts to Islam took direct control of what they called Sebta. It was then destroyed during their great revolt against the Umayyad Caliphate around 740. Sebta subsequently remained a small village of Muslims and Christians surrounded by ruins until its resettlement in the 9th century by Mâjakas, chief of the Majkasa Berber tribe, who started the short-lived Banu Isam dynasty. His great-grandson briefly allied his tribe with the Idrisids, but Banu Isam rule ended in 931 when he abdicated in favor of Abd ar-Rahman III, the Umayyad ruler of Córdoba.

Chaos ensued with the fall of the Caliphate of Córdoba in 1031. Following this, Ceuta and Muslim Iberia were controlled by successive North African dynasties. Starting in 1084, the Almoravid Berbers ruled the region until 1147, when the Almohads conquered the land. Apart from Ibn Hud's rebellion in 1232, they ruled until the Tunisian Hafsids established control. The Hafsids' influence in the west rapidly waned, and Ceuta's inhabitants eventually expelled them in 1249. After this, a period of political instability persisted, under competing interests from the Marinids and Granada as well as autonomous rule under the native Banu al-Azafi. The Fez finally conquered the region in 1387, with assistance from Aragon.

Portuguese

On the morning of 21 August 1415, King John I of Portugal led his sons and their assembled forces in a surprise assault that would come to be known as the Conquest of Ceuta. The battle was almost anticlimactic, because the 45,000 men who traveled on 200 Portuguese ships caught the defenders of Ceuta off guard and suffered only eight casualties. By nightfall the town was captured. On the morning of 22 August, Ceuta was in Portuguese hands. Álvaro Vaz de Almada, 1st Count of Avranches was asked to hoist what was to become the flag of Ceuta, which is identical to the flag of Lisbon, but in which the coat of arms derived from that of the Kingdom of Portugal was added to the center; the original Portuguese flag and coat of arms of Ceuta remained unchanged, and the modern-day Ceuta flag features the configuration of the Portuguese shield.

John's son Henry the Navigator distinguished himself in the battle, being wounded during the conquest. The looting of the city proved to be less profitable than expected for John I; he decided to keep the city to pursue further enterprises in the area.

From 1415 to 1437, Pedro de Meneses became the first governor of Ceuta.

The Benemerine sultan started the 1419 siege but was defeated by the first governor of Ceuta before reinforcements arrived in the form of John, Constable of Portugal and his brother Henry the Navigator who were sent with troops to defend Ceuta.

Under King John I's son, Duarte, the colony at Ceuta rapidly became a drain on the Portuguese treasury. Trans-Saharan trade journeyed instead to Tangier. It was soon realized that without the city of Tangier, possession of Ceuta was worthless. In 1437, Duarte's brothers Henry the Navigator and Fernando, the Saint Prince persuaded him to launch an attack on the Marinid sultanate. The resulting Battle of Tangier (1437), led by Henry, was a debacle. In the resulting treaty, Henry promised to deliver Ceuta back to the Marinids in return for allowing the Portuguese army to depart unmolested, which he reneged on.

Possession of Ceuta would indirectly lead to further Portuguese expansion. The main area of Portuguese expansion, at this time, was the coast of the Maghreb, where there was grain, cattle, sugar, and textiles, as well as fish, hides, wax, and honey.

Ceuta had to endure alone for 43 years, until the position of the city was consolidated with the taking of Ksar es-Seghir (1458), Arzila and Tangier (1471) by the Portuguese.

The city was recognized as a Portuguese possession by the Treaty of Alcáçovas (1479) and by the Treaty of Tordesillas (1494).

In the 1540s the Portuguese began building the Royal Walls of Ceuta as they are today including bastions, a navigable moat and a drawbridge. Some of these bastions are still standing, like the bastions of Coraza Alta, Bandera and Mallorquines.

Luís de Camões lived in Ceuta between 1549 and 1551, losing his right eye in battle, which influenced his work of poetry Os Lusíadas.

Iberian Union
In 1578 King Sebastian of Portugal died at the Battle of Alcácer Quibir (known as the Battle of Three Kings) in what is today northern Morocco, without descendants, triggering the 1580 Portuguese succession crisis. His granduncle, the elderly Cardinal Henry, succeeded him as King, but Henry also had no descendants, having taken holy orders. When the cardinal-king died two years after Sebastian's death, three grandchildren of King Manuel I of Portugal claimed the throne: Infanta Catarina, Duchess of Braganza; António, Prior of Crato; and Philip II of Spain (Uncle of former King Sebastian of Portugal), who would prevail and be crowned King Philip I of Portugal in 1581, uniting the two crowns and overseas empires in what is historically referred to as the "Iberian Union".

During the Iberian Union 1580 to 1640, Ceuta attracted many settlers of Spanish origin. Ceuta became the only city of the Portuguese Empire that sided with Spain, when Portugal regained its independence in the Portuguese Restoration War of 1640.

Spanish

On 1 January 1668, King Afonso VI of Portugal recognised the formal allegiance of Ceuta to Spain and ceded Ceuta to King Carlos II of Spain by the Treaty of Lisbon.

The city was attacked by Moroccan forces under Moulay Ismail during the Siege of Ceuta (1694–1727). During the longest siege in history, the city underwent changes leading to the loss of its Portuguese character. While most of the military operations took place around the Royal Walls of Ceuta, there were also small-scale penetrations by Spanish forces at various points on the Moroccan coast, and seizure of shipping in the Strait of Gibraltar.

During the Napoleonic Wars (1803-1815), Spain allowed Britain to occupy Ceuta. Occupation began in 1810, with Ceuta being returned at the conclusion of the Wars.

Disagreements regarding the border of Ceuta resulted in the Hispano-Moroccan War (1859–60), which ended at the Battle of Tetuán.

In July 1936, General Francisco Franco took command of the Spanish Army of Africa and rebelled against the Spanish republican government; his military uprising led to the Spanish Civil War of 1936–1939. Franco transported troops to mainland Spain in an airlift using transport aircraft supplied by Germany and Italy. Ceuta became one of the first casualties of the uprising: General Franco's rebel nationalist forces seized Ceuta, while at the same time the city came under fire from the air and sea forces of the official republican government.

The Llano Amarillo monument was erected to honor Francisco Franco, it was inaugurated on 13 July 1940. The tall obelisk has since been abandoned, but the shield symbols of the Falange and Imperial Eagle remain visible.

Following the 1947 Partition of India, a substantial number of Sindhi Hindus from current-day Pakistan settled in Ceuta, adding up to a small Hindu community that had existed in Ceuta since 1893, connected to Gibraltar's.

When Spain recognized the independence of Spanish Morocco in 1956, Ceuta and the other  remained under Spanish rule. Spain considered them integral parts of the Spanish state, but Morocco has disputed this point.

Culturally, modern Ceuta is part of the Spanish region of Andalusia. It was attached to the province of Cádiz until 1925, the Spanish coast being only 20 km (12.5 miles) away. It is a cosmopolitan city, with a large ethnic Arab-Berber Muslim minority as well as Sephardic Jewish and Hindu minorities.

On 5 November 2007, King Juan Carlos I visited the city, sparking great enthusiasm from the local population and protests from the Moroccan government. It was the first time a Spanish head of state had visited Ceuta in 80 years.

Since 2010, Ceuta (and Melilla) have declared the Muslim holiday of Eid al-Adha, or Feast of the Sacrifice, an official public holiday. It is the first time a non-Christian religious festival has been officially celebrated in Spanish ruled territory since the Reconquista.

Geography

It is dominated by Monte Anyera, a hill along its western frontier with Morocco, which is guarded by a Spanish military fort. Monte Hacho on the Peninsula of Almina overlooking the port is one of the possible locations of the southern pillar of the Pillars of Hercules of Greek legend (the other possibility being Jebel Musa).

Important Bird Area
The Ceuta Peninsula has been recognised as an Important Bird Area (IBA) by BirdLife International because the site is part of a migratory bottleneck, or choke point, at the western end of the Mediterranean for large numbers of raptors, storks and other birds flying between Europe and Africa. These include European honey buzzards, black kites, short-toed snake eagles, Egyptian vultures, griffon vultures, black storks, white storks and Audouin's gulls.

Climate
Ceuta has a maritime-influenced Mediterranean climate, similar to nearby Spanish and Moroccan cities such as Tarifa, Algeciras or Tangiers. Ceuta has relatively mild winters for the latitude, while summers are warm yet milder than in the interior of Southern Spain, due to the moderating effect of the Straits of Gibraltar.

Government and administration 

Since 1995, Ceuta is, along with Melilla, one of the two autonomous cities of Spain.

Ceuta is part of the territory of the European Union. The city was a free port before Spain joined the European Union in 1986. Now it has a low-tax system within the Economic and Monetary Union of the European Union.

Since 1979, Ceuta has held elections to its 25-seat assembly every four years. The leader of its government was the Mayor until the Autonomy Statute provided for the new title of Mayor-President. , the People's Party (PP) won 18 seats, keeping Juan Jesús Vivas as Mayor-President, which he has been since 2001. The remaining seats are held by the regionalist Caballas Coalition (4) and the Socialist Workers' Party (PSOE, 3).

Owing to its small population, Ceuta elects only one member of the Congress of Deputies, the lower house of the Spanish legislature.  election, this post is held by María Teresa López of Vox.

Ceuta is subdivided into 63  ("neighborhoods"), such as Barriada de Berizu, Barriada de P. Alfonso, Barriada del Sarchal, and El Hacho.

Ceuta maintains its own police force.

Defence and Civil Guard 

The defence of the enclave is the responsibility of the Spanish Armed Forces' General Command of Ceuta (COMGECEU). The Spanish Army's combat components of the command include:

 54th Regulares Infantry Regiment based in González Tablas barracks;
 2nd Tercio Duke of Alba Regiment of the Spanish Legion based in the Seraglio-Recarga cantonment;
 3rd "Montesa" Cavalry Regiment (RC-3) located in the Colonel Galindo barracks and equipped with Leopard 2 main battle tanks and Pizarro infantry fighting vehicles
 30th Mixed Artillery Regiment, one group equipped with 155/52mm towed howitzers and the other with Mistral short-range SAMs and 35/90 SKYDOR/35/90 GDF-007 anti-aircraft guns fulfilling an air defence role; and,
 7th Engineer Regiment

The command also includes its headquarters battalion as well as logistics elements.

In 2023, the Spanish Navy replaced the Aresa-class patrol boat P-114 in the territory with the Rodman-class patrol boat Isla de León.

Ceuta itself is only  distant from the main Spanish naval base at Rota on the Spanish mainland. The Spanish Air Force's Morón Air Base is also within  proximity.

The Civil Guard is responsible for border security and protects both the territory's fortified land border as well as its maritime approaches against frequent, and sometimes significant, migrant incursions.

Economy

The official currency of Ceuta is the euro. It is part of a special low tax zone in Spain. Ceuta is one of two Spanish port cities on the northern shore of Africa, along with Melilla. They are historically military strongholds, free ports, oil ports, and also fishing ports. Today the economy of the city depends heavily on its port (now in expansion) and its industrial and retail centres. Ceuta Heliport is now used to connect the city to mainland Spain by air. Lidl, Decathlon and El Corte Inglés have branches in Ceuta. There is also a casino.
Border trade between Ceuta and Morocco is active because of advantage of tax-free status. Thousands of Moroccan women are involved in the cross-border porter trade daily, as porteadoras. The Moroccan dirham is used in such trade, even though prices are marked in euros.

Transport
The city's Port of Ceuta receives high numbers of ferries each day from Algeciras in Andalusia in the south of Spain. The closest airport is Sania Ramel Airport in Morocco.

A single road border checkpoint to the south of Ceuta near Fnideq allows for cars and pedestrians to travel between Morocco and Ceuta. An additional border crossing for pedestrians exists between Benzú and Belyounech on the northern coast. The rest of the border is closed and inaccessible.

There is a bus service throughout the city, and while it does not pass into neighbouring Morocco, it services both frontier crossings.

Hospitals
The following hospitals are located within Ceuta:
 University Hospital of Ceuta, established in 2010, 252 beds
 Primary Care Emergency Services Jose Lafont
 Ceuta Medical Centre
 Spanish Military Hospital (500 beds in 1929, 2020 listed as a clinic)

Demographics
As of 2018, its population was 85,144.
Due to its location, Ceuta is home to a mixed ethnic and religious population. The two main religious groups are Christians and Muslims. As of 2006 approximately 50% of the population was Christian and approximately 48% Muslim. As of a 2018 estimate, around 67.8% of the city's population were born in Ceuta.

Spanish is the primary and official language of the enclave. Moroccan Arabic (Darija) is widely spoken. In 2021, the Council of Europe demanded that Spain formally recognize the language by 2023.

Religion

Christianity has been present in Ceuta continuously from late antiquity, as evidenced by the ruins of a basilica in downtown Ceuta and accounts of the martyrdom of St. Daniel Fasanella and his Franciscans in 1227 during the Almohad Caliphate.

The town's Grand Mosque had been built over a Byzantine-era church. In 1415, the year of the city's conquest, the Portuguese converted the Grand Mosque into Ceuta Cathedral. The present form of the cathedral dates to refurbishments undertaken in the late 17th century, combining baroque and neoclassical elements. It was dedicated to StMary of the Assumption in 1726.

The Roman Catholic Diocese of Ceuta was established in 1417. It incorporated the suppressed Diocese of Tanger in 1570. The Diocese of Ceuta was a suffragan of Lisbon until 1675, when it became a suffragan of Seville. In 1851, Ceuta's administration was notionally merged into the Diocese of Cádiz and Ceuta as part of a concordat between Spain and the Holy See; the union was not actually accomplished, however, until 1879.

Small Jewish and Hindu minorities are also present in the city.

Roman Catholicism is the largest religion in Ceuta. In 2019, the proportion of Ceutans that identify themselves as Roman Catholic was 60.0%. The next largest religion was Islam (36.7%).

Migration

Like Melilla, Ceuta attracts African migrants who try to use it as an entry to Europe. The fences are regularly stormed by migrants trying to claim asylum once they enter Ceuta.

Education
The University of Granada offers undergraduate programs at their campus in Ceuta. Like all areas of Spain, Ceuta is also served by the National University of Distance Education (UNED).

While primary and secondary education are generally offered in Spanish only, a growing number of schools are entering the Bilingual Education Program.

Notable people from Ceuta

up to 1800 
 Qadi Ayyad (1083 in Ceuta 1149) born in Ceuta, then belonging to the Almoravids was the great imam of that city
 Muhammad al-Idrisi (1100 in Ceuta 1165 in Ceuta) was a Muslim geographer, cartographer and Egyptologist. He lived in Palermo at the court of King Roger II of Sicily, known for the "Tabula Rogeriana".
 Abu al-Abbas as-Sabti (1129 in Ceuta 1204 in Marrakesh) the main Wali of Marrakesh
 Joseph ben Judah of Ceuta (c. 1160 1226) a Jewish physician and poet, and disciple of Moses Maimonides
 Abu al-Abbas al-Azafi (1162 in Ceuta 1236) a religious and legal scholar, member of the Banu al-Azafi who ruled Ceuta
 Mohammed ibn Rushayd (1259 in Sabta 1321) a judge, writer and scholar of Hadith 
 Álvaro of Braganza (1440–1504) a president of Council of Castile.
 George Camocke (1666–1732) a Royal Navy captain and former admiral for Spain who was exiled to Ceuta to live out the last years of his life.
 Don Fernando de Leyba (1734 in Ceuta 1780) a Spanish officer who served as the third governor of Upper Louisiana from 1778 until his death.
 Brigadier General Francisco Antonio García Carrasco Díaz (1742 in Ceuta 1813 in Lima, Peru) a Spanish soldier and Royal Governor of Chile
 Sebastián Kindelán y O'Regan (1757 in Ceuta 1826 in Santiago de Cuba) a colonel in the Spanish Army who served as governor of East Florida 1812/1815, of Santo Domingo 1818/1821 and was provisional governor of Cuba 1822/1823
 Isidro de Alaix Fábregas Count of Vergara and Viscount of Villarrobledo, (1790 in Ceuta 1853 in Madrid) a Spanish general of the First Carlist War who backed Isabella II of Spain

since 1800 
 General Francisco Llano de la Encomienda (1879 in Ceuta 1963 in Mexico City), a Spanish soldier. During the Spanish Civil War (1936–1939) he remained loyal to the Second Spanish Republic
 General Antonio Escobar Huertas (1879 in Ceuta executed 1940 in Barcelona), a Spanish military officer
 África de las Heras Gavilán (1909 in Ceuta 1988 in Moscow), a Spanish Communist, naturalized Soviet citizen, and KGB spy who went by the code name Patria
 Eugenio Martín (born 1925 in Ceuta), a Spanish film director and screenwriter 
 Jacob Hassan, PhD (1936 in Ceuta 2006 in Madrid), a Spanish philologist of Sephardic Jewish descent
 Manuel Chaves González (born 1945 in Ceuta), a Spanish politician of the Spanish Socialist Workers' Party. He served as the Third Vice President of the Spanish Government from 2009 to 2011
 Ramón Castellano de Torres (born 1947 in Ceuta), a Spanish artist, thought by some to be an expressionist painter
 Ignacio Velázquez Rivera (born 1953), first Mayor-President of Melilla
 Juan Jesús Vivas Lara (born 1953 in Ceuta), became the Mayor-President of Ceuta in Spain in 2001 
 Pedro Avilés Gutiérrez (born 1956 in Ceuta), a Spanish novelist from Madrid.
 Eva María Isanta Foncuberta (born 1971 in Ceuta), a Spanish actress 
 Mohamed Taieb Ahmed (born 1975 in Ceuta), a Spanish-Moroccan drug lord  responsible for trafficking hashish across the Strait of Gibraltar and into Spain.

Sport 
 Francisco Lesmes (1924–2005) and Rafael Lesmes (1926–2012), brothers and Spanish footballers.
 José Martínez Sánchez (born 1945 in Ceuta), nicknamed Pirri, a retired Spanish footballer, mainly played for Real Madrid, appearing in 561 competitive games and scoring 172 goals
 José Ramón López (born 1950), a sprint canoer, silver medallist at the 1976 Summer Olympics
 Miguel Bernardo Bianquetti (born 1951 in Ceuta), known as Migueli, a Spanish retired footballer, 391 caps for FC Barcelona and 32 for Spain
 Nayim (born 1966 in Ceuta), a retired Spanish footballer; he scored a last-minute goal for Real Zaragoza in the 1995 UEFA Cup Winners' Cup Final.
 Lorena Miranda (born 1991 in Ceuta), a Spanish female water polo player, silver medallist at the 2012 Summer Olympics.
 Anuar Tuhami (born 1995 in Ceuta), a Spanish-Moroccan footballer, played one game for Morocco

Twin towns and sister cities

Ceuta is twinned with:

 Aci Catena, Italy
 Algeciras, Spain (since 1997)
 Buenos Aires, Argentina
 Cádiz, Spain (since 2007)
 Melilla, Spain
 Santarém, Portugal

Dispute with Morocco

The government of Morocco has repeatedly called for Spain to transfer the sovereignty of Ceuta and Melilla, along with uninhabited islets such as the islands of Alhucemas, Velez and the Perejil island, drawing comparisons with Spain's territorial claim to Gibraltar. In both cases, the national governments and local populations of the disputed territories reject these claims by a large majority. The Spanish position is that both Ceuta and Melilla are integral parts of Spain, and have been since the 16th century, centuries prior to Morocco's independence from Spain and France in 1956, whereas Gibraltar, being a British Overseas Territory, is not and never has been part of the United Kingdom. Morocco has claimed the territories are colonies. One of the chief arguments used by Morocco to reclaim Ceuta comes from geography, as this exclave, which is surrounded by Morocco and the Mediterranean Sea, has no territorial continuity with the rest of Spanish territory. This argument was originally developed by one of the founders of the Moroccan Istiqlal Party, Alal-El Faasi, who openly advocated the Moroccan conquest of Ceuta and other territories under Spanish rule.

In 1986, Spain entered the North Atlantic Treaty Organization.
However Ceuta and Melilla are not under NATO protection since Article 6 of the treaty limits the coverage to Europe and North America and islands north of the Tropic of Cancer.
This contrasts with French Algeria which was explicitly included in the treaty.
Legal experts have interpreted that other articles could cover the Spanish North African cities but this interpretation has not been tested in practice. On the occasion of NATO's Madrid Summit in 2022, the issue of the protection Ceuta and Melilla was a prominent one with NATO Secretary General Jens Stoltenberg stating: "On which territories NATO protects and Ceuta and Melilla, NATO is there to protect all Allies against any threats. At the end of the day, it will always be a political decision to invoke Article 5, but rest assured NATO is there to protect and defend all Allies".

On 21 December 2020, following the affirmations of the Moroccan Prime Minister, Saadeddine Othmani,  stating that Ceuta and Melilla "are Moroccan as the Sahara [is]", Spain urgently summoned the Moroccan ambassador to convey that Spain expects all its partners to respect the sovereignty and territorial integrity of its territory in Africa and asked for explanations of Othmani's words.

See also

AD Ceuta FC, football club
Arab Baths in Ceuta
Benzú
Hotel Tryp Ceuta
Ceuta border fence
Ceuta and Melilla (disambiguation)
Plazas de soberanía – Spanish exclaves on the Moroccan coast
Porteadoras – mule ladies, bale workers
Royal Walls of Ceuta
Spanish Morocco
European enclaves in North Africa before 1830

References

Citations

Bibliography
 . 
 .
 .
 .
 .
 .

External links

 
 Official Ceuta government website
Ceuta tourism website

 
Autonomous cities of Spain
Enclaves and exclaves
Former Portuguese colonies
Kingdom of the Algarve
Mediterranean port cities and towns in Spain
Morocco–Spain border crossings
NUTS 2 statistical regions of the European Union
Populated places of the Byzantine Empire
Port cities in Africa
Special territories of the European Union
States and territories established in 1995
Territorial disputes of Morocco
Territorial disputes of Spain
North Africa
5th-century BC establishments
Populated places established in the 5th century BC
1415 establishments in the Portuguese Empire
1668 disestablishments in the Portuguese Empire
1668 establishments in the Spanish Empire
1995 disestablishments in the Spanish Empire
Phoenician colonies in Spain
Important Bird Areas of Spain
Important Bird Areas of Africa